The Taj-ul-Masajid or Tāj-ul-Masjid, is a mosque situated in Bhopal, Madhya Pradesh, India. It is the largest mosque in India and one of the largest mosques in the world.

History
The construction of the Taj-ul-Masajid was started by Nawab Shah Jahan Begum of Bhopal, in the newly built walled suburb of Shahjahanabad. The exact year when construction was started is unclear; Sharma estimates it to be 1871. After Shah Jahan Begum died in 1901, the mosque continued to be built by her daughter Sultan Jahan Begum, till the end of her lifetime. The structure was planned in the midst of three water bodies, namely: Munshi Hussain Talab; Noor Mahal Talab; and Motia Talab.

The mosque was not completed due to a lack of funds, and construction did not resume until 1971. The entrance was renovated with motifs from 13th century Syrian mosques donated by the Emir of Kuwait in memory of his late wife.

During the COVID-19 pandemic, the mosque was used as a vaccination center.

Architecture
The Taj-ul-Masajid largely takes inspiration from Mughal architecture. The mosque has a pink facade topped by two 18-storey high octagonal minarets with marble domes, an impressive main hallway with attractive pillars, and marble flooring resembling the likes of Jama Masjid in Delhi and the Badshahi Mosque of Lahore. It has a courtyard with a large ablution tank in the centre. It has a double-storeyed gateway with four recessed archways and nine cusped multifold openings in the main prayer hall. The massive pillars in the hall hold 27 ceilings through squinted arches of which 16 ceilings are decorated with ornate petalled designs.

The mosque also features a zenana (women's gallery), rare given that prayer from home was the norm for women at the time of the mosque's construction.

Annual congregation

The Bhopal Tablighi Ijtema is an annual three-day congregation that draws people from all over the world. It was held at Taj-ul-Masajid until it was shifted to Intkhedi outside the city due to shortage of space.

Gallery

References

External links
 

Tourist attractions in Bhopal
Mosques in Madhya Pradesh
Mosques completed in 1985
Buildings and structures in Bhopal
20th-century mosques
1985 establishments in Madhya Pradesh
20th-century architecture in India